Cold Sweat is a 1993 thriller film about a man who lives a double life as a hitman. The film was directed by Gail Harvey, and stars Ben Cross, Adam Baldwin, and Shannon Tweed.

Reception
Variety said, "Director Gail Harvey does the best she can with her material, but in the process, “Cold Sweat” is revealed as what it is: a low-budget film designed primarily for production-cost recoupment in foreign territories and homevideo."

References

External links
 

1993 films
1990s exploitation films
English-language Canadian films
1990s erotic thriller films
Films scored by Paul Zaza
Canadian erotic thriller films
1990s English-language films
1990s Canadian films